Radoslav Shandarov (born 11 July 1996) is a Bulgarian tennis player.

Shandarov has a career high ATP doubles ranking of 1445 achieved on 11 December 2017.

Shandarov made his ATP main draw debut at the 2018 Sofia Open as an alternate in the doubles main draw partnering with his brother Vasil Shandarov. He also entered as an alternate in doubles at the 2021 Sofia Open partnering Plamen Milushev.

References

External links

1996 births
Living people
Bulgarian male tennis players
21st-century Bulgarian people